Stefan Kostadinov (born 21 June 1984) is a Bulgarian footballer, who plays for Botev Plovdiv as a midfielder.

References

1984 births
Living people
Bulgarian footballers
PFC Pirin Blagoevgrad players
Neftochimic Burgas players
Botev Plovdiv players
PFC Rilski Sportist Samokov players
First Professional Football League (Bulgaria) players
Association football midfielders
People from Vidin